Picture Perfect Morning is the solo debut album by American singer-songwriter Edie Brickell, released in 1994 (see 1994 in music). The video for "Good Times" was included as part of the multimedia samples included on Microsoft's Windows 95 Companion CD-ROM.

Track listing
All tracks written by Edie Brickell.

"Tomorrow Comes" – 3:56
"Green" – 3:21
"When the Lights Go Down" – 3:48
"Good Times" – 3:09
"Another Woman's Dream" – 2:45
"Stay Awhile" – 4:35
"Hard Times" – 3:41
"Olivia" – 3:43
"In the Bath" – 2:43
"Picture Perfect Morning" – 3:20
"Lost in the Moment" – 6:03

Personnel 
 Edie Brickell – vocals, acoustic guitar (1, 2, 3, 7, 9, 10, 11)
 Art Neville – organ (1), keyboards (4), electric piano (5)
 Leon Pendarvis – synthesizers (2)
 Dr. John – acoustic piano (6), synthesizers (10)
 Joel Diamond – organ (6)
 Michael Bearden – synthesizers (7)
 Steve Riley – accordion (10)
 Bill Dillon – electric guitar (1-5, 7, 8, 9, 11)
 Brian Stoltz – electric guitar (1, 4, 5)
 John Leventhal – acoustic guitar (2), electric guitar (7, 11)
 Paul Simon – acoustic guitar (2, 3, 10)
 Kenny Withrow – electric guitar (3, 7, 8, 9)
 David Bromberg – slide guitar (6)
 Larry Campbell – pedal steel guitar (2, 6), violin (2)
 Jerry Douglas – dobro (6)
 Nelson González – tres (8)
 Tony Hall – bass (1, 4, 5)
 Butch Amiot – bass (2, 6)
 Brad Houser – bass (3, 9)
 Bakithi Kumalo – bass (7, 8, 10, 11)
 Willie Green – drums (1, 4, 5)
 Shawn Pelton – drums (3, 7-11)
 Richard Crooks – drums (6)
 Cyril Neville – percussion (1)
 Cyro Baptista – percussion (2)
 Mingo Araújo – percussion (3)
 Errol "Crusher" Bennett – percussion (5)
 Madeleine Yayodele Nelson – chakeire (5), backing vocals (5)
 Bashiri Johnson – congas (7), percussion (9, 11)
 Dave Samuels – vibraphone (7)
 John Bush – triangle (9)
 Skip La Plante – percussion (10)
 Herb Besson – trombone (6)
 Michael Davis – trombone (6)
 Keith O'Quinn – trombone (6)
 James Pugh – trombone (6)
 Michael Brecker – EWI (9)
 The Dixie Cups – backing vocals (1)
 Charles Elam III – backing vocals (4)
 Terrance Manuel – backing vocals (4)
 Earl Smith Jr. – backing vocals (4)
 Barry White – spoken voice (4)
 Phyllis Bethel – backing vocals (5)
 Victor Cook – backing vocals (7)
 Dennis King – backing vocals (7)
 Maurice Lauchner – backing vocals (7)
 Vivian Cherry – backing vocals (11)

Production 
 Paul Simon – producer 
 Roy Halee – producer, engineer 
 Andy Smith – second engineer 
 Malcolm Burn – recording (1, 4, 5)
 Roger Branch – recording assistant (1, 4, 5)
 David Bromberg – bass and violin recording (2), co-producer (6)
 Dave Wittman – bass and violin recording assistant (2)
 Greg Calbi – mastering 
 Tom Zutaut – A&R 
 Jimmy Corona – session coordinator
 Marc Silag – session coordinator
 Dolores Lusitana – project coordinator 
 Leslie Horan Smith – painting
 Michael Halsband – photography 
 Vaughn Hazell – back cover photography
 Kevin Mazur – photography (Edie and Roy Halee)
 Jeff Kramer – management 
 Chris Scott – management

Studios
 Engineered at The Hit Factory (New York City, New York).
 Recorded at Electric Lady Studios (New York City, New York) and Sea-Saint Studio (New Orleans, Louisiana).
 Mastered at Masterdisk (New York City, New York).

Charts

Notes 

Edie Brickell albums
1994 debut albums
Albums produced by Roy Halee
Albums produced by Paul Simon
Geffen Records albums
Albums produced by David Bromberg